Adriana (Ariaantje) Maas (14 September 1702, in Amsterdam – 30 November 1746, in Amsterdam) was a Dutch stage actress. She was the daughter of carpenter Joshua Maas and Valentine Jannetje. In 1727 she married actor Paul van Schagen (1698–1731). Earlier in her career, she was a seamstress and student of actress Adriana van Tongeren. Adriana was active at the theatre in Amsterdam from  1722–1746. Maas was counted among the great stars among her age and was very popular during the 1730s, frequently playing leading roles. She was replaced as leading actress in the 1740s by Anna Maria de Bruyn.

References 
 Anna de Haas, Maas, Adriana, in: Digitaal Vrouwenlexicon van Nederland., 13 January 2014.

1702 births
1746 deaths
18th-century Dutch actresses
Actresses from Amsterdam
Dutch stage actresses